Rauma may refer to:

Places
 Rauma, Finland, a town and municipality in the Satakunta region of western Finland
 Rauma, Norway, a municipality in Møre og Romsdal county, Norway
 Rauma (river), a river in the Romsdalen valley in Møre og Romsdal county, Norway

Boats
 Rauma-class missile boat, a class of Finnish Fast Attack Craft
 HNoMS Rauma (1939), the first ship of the Norwegian Otra class minesweepers
 HNoMS Rauma (1939), the second ship of the Norwegian Otra class minesweepers

Other
 Rauma dialect, a nearly-extinct dialect of the Finnish language
 Rauma Line, a railway line in Møre og Romsdal county, Norway
 Rauma-Repola Oy (-1991), and Rauma Oy (1991–1999); former Finnish companies, now part of Metso Corporation
 FC Rauma, a football club in Rauma municipality, Norway
 1882 Rauma, a main-belt asteroid